Henk Prinsen (born 25 December 1951) is a Dutch racing cyclist. He rode in the 1974 Tour de France.

References

1951 births
Living people
Dutch male cyclists
Place of birth missing (living people)